The women's 100 metres at the 2017 World Championships in Athletics was held at the London Olympic Stadium on .

Summary
Going into the competition, Elaine Thompson could be nothing but the hot favourite to win the title. She was the Olympic Champion from Rio and the world leader by a huge margin. Defending champion Shelly-Ann Fraser-Pryce did not compete as she expected her first child. Returning silver medallist Dafne Schippers did not seem to be in her best shape, while the bronze medallist from 2015, Tori Bowie was expected to be among the medal contenders.

In the first semi-final, Marie-Josée Ta Lou won by 0.11 seconds over Dafne Schippers. Elaine Thompson proved why she was the favourite,  winning her semi-final in 10.84 seconds, the fastest time of the day, ahead of Rosângela Santos who broke the South American continental record, while Bowie ran 10.91 seconds to win the third semi-final.

In the final, Ta Lou established an early lead. Thompson had the slowest reaction to the gun and failed to get into contention. Bowie, who had been closing on the leader, leaned early for her dip at the line, winning and then stumbling to the track. Returning silver medallist Dafne Schippers took bronze.	

Bowie's injury following the race caused her to drop out of the 200 metres.

Records
Before the competition records were as follows:

The following records were set at the competition:

Qualification standard
The standard to qualify automatically for entry was 11.26.

Schedule
The event schedule, in local time (UTC+1), was as follows:

Results

Heats
The first round took place on 5 August in six heats as follows:

The first three in each heat ( Q ) and the next six fastest ( q ) qualified for the semifinals. The overall results were as follows:

Semifinals
The semifinals took place on 6 August in three heats as follows:

The first two in each heat ( Q ) and the next two fastest ( q ) qualified for the final. The overall results were as follows:

Final
The final took place on 6 August at 21:51. The wind was +0.1 metres per second and the results were as follows (photo finish):

References

100
100 metres at the World Athletics Championships